Jonah Jackson (born February 5, 1997) is an American football offensive guard for the Detroit Lions of the National Football League (NFL). He played college football at Ohio State and Rutgers.

Early life and high school
Jackson grew up in Media, Pennsylvania. He started his football career at an early age playing for the Rose Tree Colts. He continued playing football into high school, attending Penncrest High School. He was named first-team All-Central Athletic League and first-team All-Delaware County as a senior.

College career
Jackson spent the first four seasons of his collegiate career at Rutgers. He redshirted his true freshman season and played in all 12 of the Scarlet Knights games the next season, mostly on the field goal protection unit. Jackson played center as a redshirt sophomore, playing in six games and starting five contests before suffering a season ending injury. As a redshirt junior, Jackson started 11 games at right guard though he missed one game due to injury and was named honorable mention All-Big Ten Conference. Following the season, he announced that he would be leaving Rutgers as a graduate transfer, eventually choosing to attend Ohio State after visiting Oklahoma.

Jackson played his final season for the Ohio State Buckeyes, starting all of the Buckeyes games at left guard and garnering first-team All-Big Ten honors.

Professional career

Jackson was selected No. 75 overall by the Detroit Lions in the 2020 NFL Draft. On June 24, 2020, the Lions signed Jackson to a four-year contract. Jackson was named the Lions starting right guard going into his rookie season. Jackson made his NFL debut on September 13, 2020 in the season opener against the Chicago Bears, starting at right guard and playing 90% of the Lions offensive snaps. Jackson has started 32 of a possible 33 games through his first 2 seasons in the league. He missed the Lions week 15 matchup against the Arizona Cardinals due to a back injury.

Jackson was selected to play in the 2022 Pro Bowl as an injury replacement.

References

External links 
 Rutgers Scarlet Knights bio
 Ohio State Buckeyes bio
 Detroit Lions bio

1997 births
Living people
American football offensive guards
Ohio State Buckeyes football players
Players of American football from Pennsylvania
People from Media, Pennsylvania
Sportspeople from Delaware County, Pennsylvania
Rutgers Scarlet Knights football players
Detroit Lions players